The 1923-24 season was Al-Mokhtalat SC's 12th season of football, since their formation in 1911.

1923 Egypt Cup

1923 Sultan Cup

References

1922 in association football
1923 in association football
Zamalek SC seasons